C51 or C-51 may refer to:

Legislation 
 Anti-terrorism Act, 2015, introduced as Bill C-51 in the 41st Canadian Parliament, 2nd Session
 Bill C-51 of the 39th Canadian Parliament, 2nd Session, a proposed amendment to the Food and Drugs Act

Vehicles 
 , an Admirable-class minesweeper of the Mexican Navy
 Caudron C.51, a French biplane floatplane
 Douglas C-51, an American transport aircraft
 JNR Class C51, a Japanese steam locomotive

Other uses 
 Caldwell 51, an irregular dwarf galaxy
 Evans Gambit, a chess opening
 GeForce 6100, a graphics processing unit